Trebendae or Trebendai was a town of ancient Lycia.

Its site is located near Gürses in Asiatic Turkey.

References

Populated places in ancient Lycia
Former populated places in Turkey